Mark Dean Allen (born January 2, 1949) is an American businessman and Republican politician who served as the state senator for the 4th district of the Oklahoma Senate from 2010 to 2022.

Political career
Mark Allen began his first term as a state senator in 2010. He has been an advocate for open carry and voted in favor of the current open carry law in Oklahoma.

Allen was among 14 Republicans who signed a pledge to vote against further bond issues for an Oklahoma City-based museum featuring Native American art.

He served as the vice chair of the Senate Transportation Committee and a member of three other committees.

Election history

References

Living people
People from Spiro, Oklahoma
Republican Party Oklahoma state senators
21st-century American politicians
1949 births